Tatyana Trapeznikova (born 3 December 1973) is a Russian speed skater. She competed at the 1994, 1998 and the 2002 Winter Olympics.

References

1973 births
Living people
Russian female speed skaters
Olympic speed skaters of Russia
Speed skaters at the 1994 Winter Olympics
Speed skaters at the 1998 Winter Olympics
Speed skaters at the 2002 Winter Olympics
Sportspeople from Ufa